Parmelia lambii is a species of foliose lichen in the family Parmeliaceae. It is found in the Antarctic Peninsula.

Taxonomy

The species was first described by Auguste-Marie Hue in 1915 as Physcia tabacina. The type specimen was collected from Jenny Island in Marguerite Bay. Although the specimen was later lost, Elke Mackenzie had examined it and written up an unpublished description in 1959. Based on Mackenzie's detailed description, Dag Olav Øvstedal proposed in 2009 that the specimen actually represented a previously unrecognized species of Parmelia. He considered that the minute punctiform (point-like) pseudocyphellae suggested a position in genus Punctelia, but the presence of atranorin and salazinic acid as lichen products indicated a placement in Parmelia. Because the name Parmelia tabacina had already been published for another taxon, a new name was need, and so Øvstedal honoured Elke Mackenzie (formerly Lamb) in the new specific epithet lambii.

References

lambii
Lichen species
Lichens described in 2009
Lichens of Antarctica